Fernand Vast (26 May 1886 – 7 June 1968) was a French cyclist, who won the road race at the 1906 Intercalated Games in Athens, Greece.

Career
In 1903, Vast came fifth in the Amateurs event at the 1903 French National Road Race Championships. In the same year, he came second at the Paris–Troyes race. In 1905, Vast came second at the France amateur middle-distance championship, behind his coach. He won the Amateurs event at the 1905 French National Road Race Championships.

Vast won the road race at the 1906 Intercalated Games in Athens, Greece. The race ended in a sprint, where Vast beat Maurice Bardonneau, one of the race favourites. Vast also finished third in the 5,000m and 20 km track events. After the Games, Vast became a professional cyclist, and came fifth in the 1906 Paris-Brussels race. In the same year, he also came second at the 10 km "Athens Grand Prix" event, held on Bastille Day. Vast finished  behind race winner Maurice Bardonneau. In 1907, he came 11th at the French Road Championships, and 15th in the Paris–Tours race.

References

External links
 Sports Reference

French male cyclists
Medalists at the 1906 Intercalated Games
Sportspeople from Hauts-de-Seine
1886 births
1968 deaths
Cyclists at the 1906 Intercalated Games
Cyclists from Île-de-France